The Oceanic island nation of Solomon Islands competed at the 2012 Summer Olympics in London, held from 27 July to 12 August 2012. This was the nation's eighth consecutive appearance at the Olympics.

Four athletes from the Solomon Islands were selected to the team by receiving their wild card places in three different sports, without having qualified. Weightlifter Jenly Tegu Wini was the national flag bearer at the opening ceremony. Solomon Islands has yet to win its first Olympic medal.

Athletics

Solomon Islands have selected two athletes by wildcard. Both athletes had to participate in a preliminary heat in the 100 m. Chris Walasi finished sixth in the heats, and twenty-third in preliminary overall. Meanwhile, Pauline Kwalea finished fifth in the heats, and twenty-first in preliminary overall. Both of these athletes failed to qualify into the main event.

Men

Women

Judo

Tony Lomo was given a continental spot for being one of the highest ranked Oceania athletes for the wildcard places. He was able to defeat Mozambique's Neuso Sigauque before losing out to world sixth-ranked Sofiane Milous of France in the round of sixteen. Lomo's performance was congratulated by the Oceania National Olympic Committee and seen as being impressive from other coaches both in and out of Oceania.

Weightlifting

Solomon Islands was given a reallocation spot to participate in a women's event. 2012 Oceania -58 kg silver medalist Jenly Tegu Wini was chosen. She finished seventeenth and last among the competitors.

References

Nations at the 2012 Summer Olympics
2012
2012 in Solomon Islands sport